Arthur Blaine Comfort (May 8, 1884 – October 1974) was an American politician in the state of Washington. He served in the Washington House of Representatives from 1943 to 1961 for District 26.

References

1884 births
1974 deaths
Republican Party members of the Washington House of Representatives